Pierre Dubois may refer to:

 Pierre Dubois (scholastic) (c. 1255–after 1321), a French publicist in the reign of Philip the Fair
 Pierre Dubois Davaugour (before 1620–1664), Governor of New France from 1661 to 1663
 Pierre Joseph Dubois (1852–1924), French World War I general
 Pierre H. Dubois (1917–1999), Dutch writer and critic
 Pierre Max Dubois (1930–1995), French composer of classical music
 Pierre du Bois de Dunilac (1943–2007), Swiss writer
 Pierre Dubois (author) (born 1945), French author
 Pierre-Luc Dubois (born 1998), Canadian professional ice hockey player